Michalis Iliadis (born 29 May 1996) is a Greek professional footballer who plays as a goalkeeper for Super League 2 club Rodos.

References

1996 births
Living people
Greek footballers
Super League Greece 2 players
Iraklis Thessaloniki F.C. players
U.S. Salernitana 1919 players
Doxa Drama F.C. players
Rodos F.C. players
Super League Greece players
Serie B players
Football League (Greece) players
Greece youth international footballers
Greek expatriate footballers
Expatriate footballers in Greece
Greek expatriate sportspeople in Italy
Association football goalkeepers
Footballers from Drama, Greece